The Italian Figure Skating Championships are a competition held annually to determine the national champions of Italy. Medals may be awarded in the disciplines of men's singles, ladies' singles, pair skating, ice dancing, and synchronized skating.

Senior medalists

Men

Ladies

Pairs

Ice dancing

Junior medalists

Men

Ladies

Pairs

Ice dancing

Advanced novice medalists

Men

Ladies

Ice dancing

References

External links
 Federazione Italiana Sport del Ghiaccio (Italian Ice Sports Federation) 

 

 
Figure skating national championships
Figure skating in Italy